Vorse is a surname. Notable people with this surname include:

 Albert O. Vorse Jr. (1914-1979), American aviator
 Karl Vorse Krombein (1912–2005), American entomologist
 Mary Heaton Vorse (1874–1966), American author

See also
 Morse (surname)
 Vose